Xiyukannemeyeria is a genus of dicynodont from Middle Triassic (Anisian) Kelamayi Formation of China. Originally was named as Parakannemeyeria brevirostris by Sun in 1978. But if included in Parakannemeyeria, this genus will not be a
monophyletic group.

References 

Kannemeyeriiformes
Anisian life
Triassic synapsids of Asia
Triassic China
Fossils of China
Fossil taxa described in 2003
Anomodont genera